

The Capital City Trail is a shared use path in Melbourne, Victoria, Australia, which circles the city centre and some inner eastern and northern suburbs. It is 29km in length, and mostly consists of sections of other trails, such as the Merri Creek Trail, Main Yarra Trail, Moonee Ponds Creek Trail and Inner Circle Rail Trail.

A popular starting point for the trail is at Princes Bridge near Flinders Street station. The rider can head off in an easterly or westerly direction. If heading off in the westerly, either side of the river can be used, but the south side tends to be more popular.

The Capital City Trail uses the same path as the Main Yarra Trail up to Dights Falls, where it continues, using the same path as the Merri Creek Trail, as part of its loop around the city.

Following the path 

The trail follows the Yarra River to Yarra Bend Park on the Yarra River Trail and meets Merri Creek at Dights Falls. It follows the Merri Creek Trail up the Merri Creek to Rushall Station, where it follows the former Inner Circle rail reserve and Royal Park. It then meets the Moonee Ponds Creek Trail, which continues back to Docklands and Southbank. At its farthest, the trail is 5 kilometres from the centre of Melbourne.

Construction 
Recently completed improvements to the trail include a footbridge crossing Manningham Street in Parkville (which removes a flight of stairs and a road crossing), and re-paving of the path and landscaping on the section that passes under the Hurstbridge railway line. Lobby group Bicycle Network continues to advocate for improvements to the trail, notably the removal of a staircase that interrupts the path at Gipps Street in Abbotsford.

Landmarks 

The trail passes by the following attractions and landmarks:

 Southbank
 Alexandra Gardens and Royal Botanic Gardens
 Melbourne Park and Melbourne Cricket Ground
 Yarra River
 Yarra Bend Park
 Collingwood Children's Farm
 Hardy Gallagher Reserve
 Merri Creek
 Rushall Garden, a community garden in North Fitzroy.
 Princes Park, location of the Ikon Park football stadium
 Royal Park
 Melbourne Zoo
 Moonee Ponds Creek
 Marvel Stadium
 Docklands

Connections 

The trail acts as central hub and has many spokes. Starting in the north and going clockwise there is the Upfield Rail Trail, Merri Creek Trail, Yarra River Trail, Gardiners Creek Trail, Sandridge Trail, Maribyrnong River Trail & Hobsons Bay Coastal Trail (via the Footscray Road path at Docklands) and finally the Moonee Ponds Creek Trail.

References 

Bike rides around Melbourne 3rd edition, 2009, Julia Blunden, Open Spaces Publishing, 
 Bike Paths Victoria sixth edition, 2004. Edited and published by Sabey & Associates Pty Ltd. pp111, 119–122. 
 Revealed – Melbourne's Best Green Secret GEOFF MOSLEY for The Age.  11 May 2010

External links 
 Bicycle Victoria – Manningham St Bridge
 Inner Circle Railway Trail – description of the trail
Route map and trail guide is on Cyclewayz app
 

Bike paths in Melbourne
Rail trails in Victoria (Australia)
Transport in the City of Melbourne (LGA)
Transport in the City of Yarra